An exemplar is a person, a place, an object, or some other entity that serves as a predominant example of a given concept (e.g. "The heroine became an exemplar in courage to the children"). It may also refer to:

 Exemplar, a well-known science problem and its solution, from Thomas Kuhn's The Structure of Scientific Revolutions
 Exemplar, the first name for the ship USS Dorothea L. Dix (AP-67)
 Exemplar, in exemplification theory, an illustrative representation of information or an event
 Exemplar, a series of parallel-computing machines introduced in 1994 by Convex Computer
 Exemplar (art history), an image or version upon which secondary or subsequent versions are dependent
 Exemplar (textual criticism), the text used to produce another version of the text
 Handwriting exemplar, a writing sample that can be examined forensically
 Exemplar theory, in psychology, a theory about how humans categorize objects and ideas
 Exemplars (comics), a fictional group of eight humans in the Marvel Comics universe
 Exemplars of Evil, an accessory to the 3.5 edition of Dungeons & Dragons that shows how to build memorable villains
 The Twenty-four Filial Exemplars, a classic text of Confucian filial piety written by Guo Jujing during the Yuan dynasty

See also 

 Example (disambiguation)
 Exemplum, a moral anecdote used to illustrate a point
 Role model